This is a list of films which have placed number one at the box office in Australia during 2018. All amounts are in Australian dollars and from Box Office Mojo.

Highest-grossing films

References

See also
List of Australian films – Australian films by year
2018 in film

2018
Australia
2018 in Australian cinema